Khensu crater is a crater on Jupiter's moon Ganymede. It is a dark-floored crater with a bright ejecta blanket located in the grooved terrain region Uruk Sulcus. The dark component may be residual material from the impactor that formed the crater. Another possibility is that the impactor may have punched through the bright surface to reveal a dark layer beneath.

References

Impact craters on Ganymede (moon)